The Nevada general election, 2016 was held on Tuesday, November 8, 2016 throughout Nevada.

United States Senate

Nevada's Class 3 Senate seat is up for election. Harry Reid retired at the end of his 5th term. Democrat Catherine Cortez Masto was elected to replace him.

United States House of Representatives

All of Nevada's four seats in the United States House of Representatives were up for election in 2016. Democrats Dina Titus, Jacklyn Rosen and Ruben Kihuen, and Republican Mark Amodei were elected.

State Legislature

Nevada Senate

Eleven out of twenty-one seats in the Nevada Senate were up for election in 2016. Seven of the seats were currently held by Democrats and four were held by Republicans. Republicans held a one-seat majority in the State Senate. Democrats flipped one Republican seat and held all of theirs, winning a slim majority.

Nevada Assembly

All 42 seats in the Nevada Assembly are up for election in 2016. Republicans currently hold 24 seats, Democrats currently hold 16 seats, Libertarians currently hold 1 seat, and there is one vacancy.

State Judicial Branch

Supreme Court

Appeals Court

Petitions

Question 1: Background Checks for Gun Purchases

Question 2: Marijuana Legalization

Question 3: Legislature to Minimize Regulations on the Energy Market and Eliminate Legal Energy Monopolies

Question 4: Medical Equipment Sales Tax Exemption

References

 
Nevada